Hussain Chak is a village in Shaheed Bhagat Singh Nagar district of Punjab State, India. The village is administrated by Sarpanch an elected representative of the village.

History 

Up until 200 years ago, the inhabitants of Hussain Chak lived in a village close to the banks of the Sutlej river. The river changed course and flooded the village plain; the inhabitants then moved to the area where the village Hussain Chak is now located. The village was named after a Muslim called Hussain Ali. Pre Partition (1947), Hussain Chak was a majority Muslim village. After partition the Muslims moved to Sialkot in Pakistan.

Demography 
As of 2011, Hussain Chak has a total number of 81 houses and population of 439 of which 223 include are males while 216 are females according to the report published by Census India in 2011. The literacy rate of Hussain Chak is 83.20%, higher than the state average of 75.84%. The population of children under the age of 6 years is 52 which is 11.85% of total population of Hussain Chak, and child sex ratio is approximately 677 as compared to Punjab state average of 846.

Most of the people are from Schedule Caste which constitutes 80.87% of total population in Hussain Chak. The town does not have any Schedule Tribe population so far.

As per the report published by Census India in 2011, 123 people were engaged in work activities out of the total population of Hussain Chak which includes 110 males and 13 females. According to census survey report 2011, 95.12% workers describe their work as main work and 4.88% workers are involved in Marginal activity providing livelihood for less than 6 months.

Education 
The village has a Punjabi medium, co-ed primary school founded in 1972. The school provide mid-day meal. The school provide free education to children between the ages of 6 and 14 as per Right of Children to Free and Compulsory Education Act.

KC Engineering College and Doaba Khalsa Trust Group Of Institutions are the nearest colleges.

Transport 

Punjabi Diaspora  

A few Hussain Chak residents moved to southern India to look for employment and then on to Malaya in the 1950s. When Malaya became an independent country known as Malaysia in 1957, the Hussain Chak residents moved to UK. The majority moved to Bedford, Bedfordshire and worked at the London Brick Company. Most of the remainder moved to Handsworth.

See also 
List of villages in India

References

External links 
 Tourism of Punjab
 Census of Punjab
 Locality Based PINCode

Villages in Shaheed Bhagat Singh Nagar district